Mitsukurinidae is a family of sharks with one living genus, Mitsukurina, and four fossil genera: Anomotodon, Protoscapanorhynchus, Scapanorhynchus, and Woellsteinia, though some taxonomists consider Scapanorhynchus to be a synonym of Mitsukurina. The only known living species is the goblin shark, Mitsukurina owstoni.

This family of sharks is named in honour of Kakichi Mitsukuri who brought the holotype of the only species in this family to David Starr Jordon to be scientifically described.

The most distinctive characteristic of the goblin sharks is the long, trowel-shaped, beak-like snout, much longer than those of other sharks. Its long snout is covered with ampullae of Lorenzini that enable it to sense minute electric fields produced by nearby prey, which it can snatch up by rapidly extending its jaws. They also possess long, protrusible jaws. When the jaws are retracted, the shark resembles a grey nurse shark, Carcharias taurus, with an unusually long nose. Its nose resembles the nose of a goblin, which is how it received its name. These sharks have only been seen about 50 times since their discovery in 1897.

References

 
Taxa named by David Starr Jordan
Shark families
Ovoviviparous fish
Extant Early Cretaceous first appearances